The O.P. Wickham House is a historic building located in Council Bluffs, Iowa, United States.  Brothers Owen and James Wickham  were born in Ireland, and settled in Council Bluffs in the 1860s.  They were brick and stonemasons by trade, and they established a contracting firm with another partner in 1863.  By 1865 the brothers were alone in the partnership, and it was a prominent construction firm into the 1930s.  This 2½-story brick Queen Anne was Owen's second house after the Wickham-De Vol House.  Its distinctive features include the jerkihhead gable ends with unusual double curving profiles, and the woodwork on the front porches with their fan-like brackets and the syncopated spacing of the frieze blocks.  The house was listed on the National Register of Historic Places in 1979.

References

Houses completed in 1888
Houses in Council Bluffs, Iowa
National Register of Historic Places in Pottawattamie County, Iowa
Houses on the National Register of Historic Places in Iowa
Queen Anne architecture in Iowa